Hypenula caminalis is a species of litter moth in the family Erebidae. It is found in North America.

The MONA or Hodges number for Hypenula caminalis is 8377.

References

Further reading

 
 
 

Herminiinae
Articles created by Qbugbot
Moths described in 1905